The Charlotte Rage were a professional arena football team based out of Charlotte, North Carolina.  They were members of the Arena Football League from 1992 to 1996.  They played their home games at the Charlotte Coliseum from 1992 to 1994 and then again in 1996 and the Independence Arena (now the Bojangles' Coliseum) in 1995.  They were owned by Allen J. Schwalb, Joanne Faruggia and former National Football League and United States Football League quarterback Cliff Stoudt.

History
The Rage were founded as an expansion team on October 10, 1991, by motion picture financier Allen J. Schwalb, who backed some of the biggest blockbusters of the 1980s including Rambo, Rain Man, Moonstruck and Thelma & Louise.  They competed in the 1992–1996 seasons. They played their home games at the Charlotte Coliseum, then also home of the Charlotte Hornets of the National Basketball Association from 1992 to 1994 and again in 1996.  They played the 1995 season at the much smaller Independence Arena.

The team made the playoffs in 1993 and 1994, losing both times to the Arizona Rattlers in the first round.  They are best known for signing former Buffalo Bills offensive lineman Joe DeLamielleure, who played only a handful of games in 1992 before retiring from football for good.  He was the only member of the Pro Football Hall of Fame to have played in the AFL, a distinction that ended in 2017 when Kurt Warner, a three-year veteran of the AFL, was inducted.

Their logo consisted of an enraged bull which was both snorting fire and surrounded by it.

The team was discontinued after the completion of the 1996 season.

The AFL would return to the Coliseum for the 2003 Arena Football League season when the Carolina Cobras moved from Raleigh, North Carolina.

Season-by-season

Players

Arena Football Hall of Famers

All-Arena players
The following Rage players have been named to All-Arena Teams:
 OL/DL Robert Stewart (2)
 K Mike Black (1)
 OS Khevin Pratt (1)

Head coaches

External links
 Charlotte Rage at ArenaFan.com

 
American football teams established in 1992
Sports clubs disestablished in 1996
American football teams in North Carolina
1992 establishments in North Carolina
1996 disestablishments in North Carolina